Gamp is a colloquial, primarily British, dated or obsolete term for an umbrella, after the Dickens character Sarah Gamp.

GAMP may refer to:

Girard Academic Music Program, a magnet secondary school in Philadelphia, Pennsylvania
Good automated manufacturing practice, a set of guidelines in the pharmaceutical industry
Grupa Arhitekata Modernog Pravca, a Serbian architects group
General artificial matrix producer, a plot element in the backstory of the game Xevious